Brum is a Portuguese surname of Dutch and Flemish roots found primarily in Portugal, Brazil, and Uruguay. Notable people with the surname include:
Alfeo Brum (1898–1972), Uruguayan politician and lawyer
Baltasar Brum (1883–1933), Uruguayan politician who served as the 23rd President of Uruguay
Banny deBrum (1956–2011), ambassador of the Republic of the Marshall Islands to the United States 
Celso Brum Junior (born 1978), Brazilian retired volleyball player
Eliane Brum (born 1960), Brazilian journalist
Fernanda Brum (born 1976), Brazilian Christian music singer
Gabriella Brum (born 1962), German-British model who won the 1980 Miss World beauty pageant
Jorge Brum do Canto (1910–1994), Portuguese film director
Jorge Luis da Silva Brum, best known as Pinga (born 1965), Brazilian former footballer
José Francisco da Terra Brum (1776–1842), Portuguese baron and winegrower
Manuel José de Arriaga Brum da Silveira e Peyrelongue (1840–1917), Portuguese politician who served as the first elected President of the First Portuguese Republic
Manuel Maria da Terra Brum (1825–1905), Portuguese baron and winegrower - son of the abovementioned José Francisco da Terra Brum
Roberto Brum (born 1978), Brazilian footballer
Roberto Brum (born 1983), Uruguayan footballer
Tony deBrum (1945–2017), Marshallese politician and government minister

References

Portuguese-language surnames